SG Flensburg-Handewitt is a professional handball club from Flensburg and Handewitt in Schleswig-Holstein, Germany. Currently, they compete in the Handball-Bundesliga and EHF European League. They play home matches at Flens-Arena. Since forming in 1990, the club has been one of Germany's most successful teams domestically and in European tournaments. The club is best known for winning the EHF Champions League in 2014 by defeating arch-rivals THW Kiel in the final 30–28.

History
SG Flensburg-Handewitt was created in 1990 following a merger of the handball divisions of TSB Flensburg and Handewitter SV.  The first season of the club (1990–1991) took place in the 2. Handball-Bundesliga, with SG finishing in fourth position under Zvonimir Serdarušić. In 1992, they were promoted to the top division as SG Flensburg-Handewitt for the first time, winning every league fixture. In their first season in the top-flight, SG finished sixteenth, though they were spared relegation due to the liquidation of TSV Milbertshofen. The following year, under the leadership of Anders Dahl-Nielsen, SG were fourth and from that point, equalled that placement or better in each season until the 2008/09 season.

SG Flensburg-Handewitt acquired their first major trophy with the 1996/1997 EHF Cup by defeating Danish side Virum-Sorgenfri HK 52–42 on aggregate in the final. Three consecutive DHB-Pokal titles (2003/04, 2004/05 and 2005/06) followed, as did success in the league, with a championship victory in the 2003/04 season. Slovenian club RK Celje did however, prevent a third trophy that year for SG by winning the 2003-04 EHF Champions League final against them. In 2007, SG once again lost the Champions League final, this time they were defeated by "Landesderby" rivals THW Kiel.

In 2010, former player Ljubomir Vranjes became the new coach and it was under him that SG Flensburg-Handewitt won the EHF Champions League final at their third attempt, beating THW Kiel 30–28 at the Lanxess Arena in Cologne. During Vranjes' time as coach of SG, they also won the DHB-Pokal for a fourth time. Maik Machulla took over from Vranjes as head coach in 2017, and consecutive league titles (their second and third successes) followed in the 2017/18 and 2018/2019 campaigns. The 2017/18 title was secured on the final day of the season with a 22–21 victory over Frisch Auf Göppingen. The following year, SG once again took the title on the final day, winning 27–24 away at Bergischer HC.  SG Flensburg-Handewitt holds a reputation as being a perennial "second-place" club – with three league titles the team has also finished runner-up fourteen times. 

The club has won all the competitions it has participated in at least once except the IHF Super Globe, and it is the only club to have won four different European Cups (one EHF Champions League, two EHF Cup Winners' Cup, one EHF European League and one EHF European Cup to which we can add several finals), in addition to the three different German national competitions (three German championships, four DHB-Pokal and three DHB-Supercup).

Due to their proximity to Scandinavia, SG typically have top international players from Denmark, Sweden and Norway in their squad. Danish right winger Lasse Svan became the club's all-time leading appearance maker during the 2021/22 season, overtaking legendary left winger and fellow Dane Lars Christiansen.

Crest, colours, supporters

Kit manufacturers

Kits

Supporters
There are four official fan clubs of SG Flensburg-Handewitt. The largest is called "Hölle Nord" (Hell North). The other three are called "Die Wikinger" (The Vikings), "Nordlichter" (Northern Lights) and the "Alte Garde" (The Old Guard). Club songs include "Hier regiert Flensburg-Handewitt" by Andreas Fahnert and "Unvergleichliches".

Rivalries
The main rival of SG Flensburg-Handewitt is fellow Schleswig-Holstein side THW Kiel. The two clubs compete in the "Nordderby" and have regularly and closely fought for national championships and in finals of the DHB-Pokal. As of May 2022, 106 matches have been contested between the two sides, with THW winning 64 and SG with 38 victories.

The other rival of SG is HSV Hamburg. Due to HSV's financial issues and subsequent license removal, Flensburg and Hamburg did not play each other for more than five years until the rivalry was renewed in October 2021 when SG won 33–27 in Hamburg.

Accomplishments
 Handball-Bundesliga:
 : 2004, 2018, 2019
 : 1996, 1997, 1999, 2000, 2003, 2005, 2006, 2008, 2012, 2013, 2016, 2017, 2020, 2021
 2. Handball-Bundesliga:
 : 1988, 1992
 DHB-Pokal:
 : 2003, 2004, 2005, 2015
 : 1992, 1994, 2000, 2011, 2012, 2013, 2014, 2016, 2017
 DHB-Supercup:
 : 2000, 2013, 2019
 : 1997, 2003, 2004, 2005, 2012, 2015, 2018, 2020
 EHF Champions League:
 : 2014
 : 2004, 2007
 : 2006
 EHF Cup Winner's Cup:
 : 2001, 2012
 : 2002
 EHF Cup:
 : 1997
 : 1998, 2000
 EHF City Cup:
 : 1999
 IHF Super Globe:
 : 2014
 Double
 Winners: 2003–04

Sports Hall information

Name: – Flens-Arena
City: – Flensburg
Capacity: – 6300
Address: – Campusallee 2, 24943 Flensburg, Germany

Team

Current squad
Squad for the 2022–23 season

Goalkeepers
1  Benjamin Burić 
 20  Kevin Møller 
Left wingers
 29  August Pedersen
 31  Emil Jakobsen
Right wingers
 26  Jóhan Hansen
Line players
4  Johannes Golla (c)
5  Simon Hald
 66  Anton Lindskog

Left backs
 22  Mads Mensah Larsen
 33  Aaron Mensing 
 64  Lasse Møller
Centre Backs
 23  Gøran Johannessen 
 24  Jim Gottfridsson
Right backs
 14  Teitur Örn Einarsson
 32  Franz Semper
 77  Magnus Abelvik Rød

Technical staff
 Head coach:  Maik Machulla
 Assistant coach:  Mark Bult
 Athletic Trainer:  Michael Döring
 Physiotherapist:  Torben Helmer
 Club doctor:  Dr. Thorsten Lange

Transfers

Transfers for the 2023–24 season

Joining
  Simon Pytlick (LB) (from  GOG Håndbold) 
  Kay Smits (RB) (from  SC Magdeburg)
  Aksel Horgen (RW) (from  Bjerringbro-Silkeborg Håndbold) ?
  Blaž Blagotinšek (P) (from  Frisch Auf Göppingen)
  Lukas Jørgensen (P) (from  GOG Håndbold) 

Leaving
  Aaron Mensing (LB) (to  GOG Håndbold) ?
  Gøran Johannessen (CB) (to  Kolstad Håndball)
  Magnus Abelvik Rød (RB) (to  Kolstad Håndball)
  Simon Hald (P) (to  Aalborg Håndbold)
  Anton Lindskog (P) ?

Transfers
Transfers for the 2024–25 season

Joining
  Niclas Kirkeløkke (RB) (from  Rhein-Neckar Löwen) ?

Leaving

Domestic competition
{|
|valign="top" width=0%|

aDue to the COVID-19 pandemic, the final table was decided on a points-per-match basis.

European competition
EHF Cup Winners' Cup: from the 2012–13 season, the men's competition was merged with the EHF Cup.EHF Cup: It was formerly known as the IHF Cup until 1993. Also, starting from the 2012–13 season the competition has been merged with the EHF Cup Winners' Cup. The competition will be known as the EHF European League from the 2020–21 season.

Note All matches ending with a 10–0 results were assessed by the EHF due to cancellations relating to coronavirus restrictions. The assessments of these results during the group stage was criticised in a statement by SG Flensburg-Handewitt.

EHF ranking

Former club members

Notable former players

  Mannhard Bech (1995–1996)
  Mark Dragunski (2002–2003)
  Jan Fegter (1995–2003, 2006–2007)
  Henning Fritz (2021)
  Holger Glandorf (2011–2020)
  Johannes Golla (2018–)
  Matthias Hahn (1994–2004)
  Jacob Heinl (1994–2018, 2019–2021)
  Andreas Hertelt (1991–1992)
  Markus Hochhaus (1993–1996)
  Jan Holpert (1993–2007)
  Lars Kaufmann (2011–2015)
  Andrej Klimovets (1997–2005)
  Thomas Knorr (1998–2001)
  Jörg Kunze (2001–2003)
  Maik Machulla (2012–2014, 2015)
  Maik Makowka (1997–2002)
  Michael Menzel (1990–1994)
  Michael Müller (2021)
  Christopher Rudeck (2009–2015)
  Holger Schneider (1992-1998)
  Jens Schöngarth (2020)
  Stefan Schröder (1999–2004)
  Walter Schubert (1991–1993)
  Franz Semper (2020–)
  Marius Steinhauser (2017–2022)
  Andreas Thiel (2001)
  Frank von Behren (2006–2008)
  Steffen Weinhold (2012–2014)
  Henning Wiechers (1993–1996)
  Aaron Ziercke (1995)
  Viktor Szilágyi (2010–2012)
  Benjamin Burić (2018–)
  Ivan Horvat (2016–2018)
  Igor Kos (2005–2006)
  Krešimir Kozina (2015–2016)
  Blaženko Lacković (2004–2008)
  Goran Šprem (2004–2005, 2005–2006)
  Morten Bjerre (1997–2000)
  Lasse Boesen (2008–2011)
  Joachim Boldsen (2001–2007)
  Lars Christiansen (1996–2010)
  Anders Eggert (2006–2008, 2009–2017)
  Søren Haagen (1998–2001)
  Simon Hald (2018–)
  Christian Hjermind (1996–2001)
  Emil Jakobsen (2021–)
  Lars Krogh Jeppesen (2000–2004)
  Jan Eiberg Jørgensen (1992–2001)
  Michael V. Knudsen (2005–2014)
  Mads Mensah Larsen (2020–)
  Aaron Mensing (2021–)
  Thomas Mogensen (2007–2018)
  Kevin Møller (2014–2018, 2021–)
  Lasse Møller (2020–)
  Kasper Nielsen (2001–2002, 2005–2008)
  Sørenn Rasmussen (2010–2014)
  Rasmus Lauge Schmidt (2015–2019)
  Søren Stryger (2001–2008)
  Lasse Svan Hansen (2008–2022)
  Henrik Toft Hansen (2015–2018)
  Jakob Thoustrup (2009)
  Anders Zachariassen (2014–2020)
  Ahmed El-Ahmar (2015)
  Kaupo Palmar (2004–2005)
  Kentin Mahé (2015–2018)
  Tamás Mocsai (2010–2012)
  Arnór Atlason (2012–2013)
  Teitur Örn Einarsson (2021–)
  Ólafur Gústafsson (2012–2014)
  Einar Hólmgeirsson (2007–2008)
  Alexander Petersson (2007–2010, 2021)
  Dani Baijens (2017–2018)
  Mark Bult (2017)
  Niels Versteijnen (2018–2020)
  Christian Berge (1999–2006)
  Torbjørn Bergerud (2018–2021)
  Alexander Buchmann (2003)
  Frode Hagen (1997–1998)
  Johnny Jensen (2003–2010)
  Gøran Johannessen (2018–)
  Magnus Jøndal (2018–2021)
  Roger Kjendalen (1996–2000)
  Jan Thomas Lauritzen (2005–2007)
  Erlend Mamelund (2009)
  Magnus Abelvik Rød (2017–)
  Frode Scheie (2001–2003)
  Glenn Solberg (2001–2003)
  Kjetil Strand (2003–2004)
  Michał Jurecki (2019–2020)
  Marcin Lijewski (2002–2008)
  Bogdan Wenta (2000–2002)
  Igor Lavrov (1998–2001)
  Alen Muratović (2008-2010)
  Petar Đorđić (2010–2013, 2015–2017)
  Draško Nenadić (2013–2015)
  Bogdan Radivojević (2013–2017)
  Dane Šijan (2007–2008)
  Marvin Lier (2019–2020)
  Mattias Andersson (2011–2018)
  Dan Beutler (2003–2011)
  Oscar Carlén (2008–2011)
  Patrik Fahlgren (2009–2011)
  Jim Gottfridsson (2013–)
  Johan Jakobsson (2014–2017)
  Simon Jeppsson (2017–2020)
  Tobias Karlsson (2009–2019)
  Anton Lindskog (2021–)
  Johan Sjöstrand (2009–2010)
  Pierre Thorsson (2003–2004)
  Albin Tingsvall (2014–2015)
  Ljubomir Vranjes (2006–2009)
  Hampus Wanne (2013–2022)

Former coaches

References

External links
 Official website

German handball clubs
Handball-Bundesliga
Handball clubs established in 1990
1990 establishments in Germany
Sport in Flensburg
Schleswig-Flensburg
Sport in Schleswig-Holstein